Stefan Cherneski (born September 19, 1978) is a Canadian former professional ice hockey right winger.

Early life 
Cherneski was born in Winnipeg, Manitoba. During his junior career, he played for the Brandon Wheat Kings in the Western Hockey League.

Career 
Cherneski was drafted in the first round, 19th overall, by the New York Rangers in the 1997 NHL Entry Draft. He suffered a fractured right patella on November 13, 1998, and was forced to retire due to the injury on January 2, 2001. He appeared in forty games with the Rangers' American Hockey League affiliate, the Hartford Wolf Pack, before retiring. He tallied just two goals and nine assists in his brief professional career.

Career statistics

References

External links

1978 births
Brandon Wheat Kings players
Canadian ice hockey right wingers
Hartford Wolf Pack players
Living people
National Hockey League first-round draft picks
New York Rangers draft picks
Ice hockey people from Winnipeg